The 2010 Bayern Rundfahrt was the 31st edition of the Bayern Rundfahrt cycle race and was held on 26 May to 30 May 2010. The race started in Erding and finished in Fürstenfeldbruck. The race was won by Maxime Monfort.

General classification

References

Bayern-Rundfahrt
2010 in German sport